Quaker Lane Farms is a historic home and farm complex located at Hyde Park in Dutchess County, New York, United States.  The complex consists of the farmhouse (c. 1804), barn (c. 1804), barn (c. 1835), an outhouse, and a corn crib.  The house is a five-bay, -story clapboard structure with a center door and inside-end brick chimneys.

It was added to the National Register of Historic Places in 2003.

References

Houses on the National Register of Historic Places in New York (state)
Federal architecture in New York (state)
Houses in Hyde Park, New York
National Register of Historic Places in Dutchess County, New York